Thrills is an album created by Andrew Bird.  It was released on April 7, 1998, on the Rykodisc label. It is the first Andrew Bird album released with Andrew Bird's Bowl of Fire.

Track listing

Other appearances

 A live version of "Depression-Pasillo" appears on Fingerlings 2.
 A line from the song "Eugene" ("Sure fatal doses of malcontent through osmosis") also appears in the song "Imitosis," from the album Armchair Apocrypha.
 Earlier versions of "Nuthinduan Waltz" and "Pathetique" are found on the album Music of Hair.

Personnel
Musicians
 Andrew Bird - violin, vocals (1-6, 9-13), mandolin (8)
 Kevin O'Donnell - drums, washboard (9, 11), pots & pans (4)
 Joshua Hirsch - bass
 James Mathus - banjo (1, 5, 6), guitar (1-4, 7-13), piano (2, 7), trombone (4)
 Katharine Whalen - vocals (4, 7, 12)
 Jack Fine - trumpet (1)

 Other persons
 Recorded and mixed by Mike Napolitano
 Mastering by Brent Lambert
 Album artwork: Audrey Niffenegger
 Photos: Dave Rosser
 Design: Steven Jurgensmeyer

References

Andrew Bird albums
1998 albums